Zachary Jones (born October 18, 2000) is an American professional ice hockey defenseman for the Hartford Wolf Pack of the American Hockey League (AHL) as a prospect to the New York Rangers of the National Hockey League (NHL). Jones was drafted by the Rangers in the third round (68th overall) of the 2019 NHL Entry Draft.

Playing career
Jones was drafted 68th overall by the New York Rangers at the 2019 NHL Entry Draft. He won an NCAA championship with the UMass Minutemen in 2020–21 prior to signing a professional contract with the Rangers on April 13, 2021. Jones made his NHL debut for the Rangers on April 22, in a 3–2 loss against the Philadelphia Flyers. With his NHL debut Jones became the sixth Virginian to play in the NHL, and the first player from Richmond, Virginia to be drafted by the NHL and to play in the NHL.

Jones recorded his first NHL point with an assist on a goal by Kaapo Kakko in his third NHL game on April 25, 2021, against the Buffalo Sabres.

Jones spent most of the  season with the Hartford Wolf Pack, although he played 12 games for the Rangers.  According to Hartford assistant coach Casey Torres, "He was awesome, I thought he was our best player for the entirety of the season. He was so dynamic. He created offense from high and low probability situations. He competed hard. Such great vision on the ice and just a real dynamic presence for us offensively on the back end.”

Career statistics

Regular season and playoffs

International

Awards and honours

References

External links
 

2000 births
AHCA Division I men's ice hockey All-Americans
American men's ice hockey defensemen
Hartford Wolf Pack players
Ice hockey people from Virginia
Living people
NCAA men's ice hockey national champions
New York Rangers draft picks
New York Rangers players
UMass Minutemen ice hockey players
Tri-City Storm players